David Alexander Kalakaua Matlin (born November 16, 1964) is the current director of athletics for the University of Hawaii at Manoa. Prior to his appointment as athletic director at Hawaii, he previously served as Executive Director of the Hawaii Bowl from 2008 to 2015. Matlin is the son of Lew Matlin, former general manager of the Hawaii Islanders baseball team. Matlin graduated from the University of Michigan with a bachelor's degree in 1987. Matlin was named athletic director at the University of Hawaii at Manoa on March 25, 2015.

References

External links
 
Hawaii profile

1964 births
Living people
Sportspeople from Honolulu
Sportspeople from Detroit
Hawaii Rainbow Warriors and Rainbow Wahine athletic directors
Hawaii Bowl
Houston Astros executives
University of Michigan alumni